Sainte Anne Island is the largest (2.27 km²) of eight islands in Ste Anne Marine National Park of the Seychelles. These islands are part of the Mont Fleuri District of the Seychelles. It is 4 km off the east coast of Mahé and has abundant tropical vegetation.

The French explorer Lazare Picault first discovered the island in 1742, on the day of Saint Anne, and the first French settlement in the Seychelles was established here in 1770. In the early 20th century the St. Abbs Whaling Company briefly maintained a whaling station on the island, the ruins of which can still be found.

In 2002, the Beachcomber Sainte Anne Resort & Spa, with 87 luxury villas, was opened on the southwest point.

The village of Sainte Anne is located next to the hotel. It contains the park rangers' quarters, dive shop, and restaurants. Some hotel staff and other employees live in the village, which has 40 people; some of the hotel staff do a daily trip from Victoria.

Tourism
Today, the island's main industry is tourism. It has 6 big beaches:
 Grande Anse, located at the southwest, where hotel Beachcomber Sainte Anne resort & spa is present.
 Anse Royale, where sea turtles lay their eggs from late November to February.
 Anse Tortues.
 Anse Cimitiere
 Anse Manon (accessible only by foot).
 Anse Cabot

Image gallery

References

External links 

 Sainte Anne - Seychelles
 
 Mahe Map 2015
 Info on the island
 Sainte Anne to be developed in order to pay bills

Islands of Mont Fleuri
Whaling stations